Lalejin District is a district (bakhsh) in Bahar County, Hamadan Province, Iran. At the 2006 census, its population was 44,568, in 10,635 families.  The District has two cities: Lalejin and Mohajeran.  The District has two rural districts (dehestan): Mohajeran Rural District and Sofalgaran Rural District.

References 

Bahar County
Districts of Hamadan Province